Earl A. "Lefty" Davis was an American football player and coach. He served as the head football coach at Missouri Wesleyan College (1917–1922), McKendree College—now known McKendree University (1923–1924), Centenary College of Louisiana (1925), and Northwest Missouri State Teacher's College—now known as Northwest Missouri State University (1927–1936). Davis played college football at Transylvania University.  Davis was also the head basketball coach at McKendree from 1923 to 1925, tallying a mark of 22–7.

Head coaching record

Football

Notes

References

Year of birth missing
Year of death missing
Centenary Gentlemen football coaches
Missouri Wesleyan Owls football coaches
McKendree Bearcats football coaches
McKendree Bearcats men's basketball coaches
Northwest Missouri State Bearcats athletic directors
Northwest Missouri State Bearcats football coaches
Transylvania Pioneers football players